The Altarpiece with Christ, Saint John the Baptist, and Saint Margaret is an autographed 1434 sculpture in Carrara marble by the Italian artist Andrea da Giona, now in the collection of The Cloisters in New York City. It was commissioned by the Knights of Malta, a band of violent Christian sailors preoccupied with defending Spain from Muslim invasion.

The carving is in the late International Gothic style, as evidenced by its folds of draperies, lush foliates, and the heavily idealised facial types of the main saints.

Christ in Majesty is at the center, flanked by the Virgin Mary and the angel Gabriel, with other angels playing musical instruments. The four Evangelists are placed at each corner. Inscriptions below the central panel read "HOC OPUS FECIT MAGISTER AND[R]EAS DA GIONA MCCCCXXXIIII" (This work was made by Master Andrea from Giona 1434).

Notes

Sources

 Wixom, William. "Medieval Sculpture at The Cloisters". The Metropolitan Museum of Art Bulletin, volume 46, no. 3, Winter, 1988–1989

Sculptures of the Metropolitan Museum of Art
Musical instruments in art
Sculptures of angels
Statues of Jesus
Statues of the Virgin Mary
Altarpieces